Family church may refer to:

First Family Church in Overland Park, Kansas
Family Integrated Church

See also
Holy Family Church (disambiguation)